Innocent Balume, known by his stage name Innoss’B, is a Congolese singer-songwriter, rapper, percussionist, and dancer from Goma, Congo DRC. In addition to adapting modern styles like Afrobeats and hip-hop, Innoss'B is a skilled djembe player.

Early life 
Innoss'B was born to a musical family – his mother was a church singer, his father was a pop music dancer and he first performed with his brothers in the group Maisha Soul. They trained at Yolé!Africa, a youth cultural center in Goma founded in 2000 by internationally acclaimed filmmaker and activist Petna Ndaliko Katondolo. At the age of 12, he won the ‘Vodacom Super Star in DR Congo’ with more than 1.3 million votes throughout the country. He was also the first winner of the Vodacom Superstars, which brought him to the attention of actor and director Ben Affleck.

Career 
In 2013 he was signed to a management contract with Interglobe Music. He has recorded and toured with Akon and is known for always mentioning Eric Mandala in his songs.

In 2019, Inoss'B released Yo Pe, a single that was a huge success. The single was then remixed with Tanzanian superstar Diamond Platnumz.   

On 26 December 2021, he released his studio album Mortel-06.

Collaborations

Discography

Awards and nominations

|-
|2007
|Innoss'B
|Revelation 2007 Awards
|
|-

|2010
|Innoss'B
|Vodacom SuperStar Awards
|
|-

|2011
|Innoss'B
|Ndule Awards as Special Jury trophy
|
|-

|2020
|Innoss'B
|BET Awards 2020 Best International Act
|

References

Living people
21st-century Democratic Republic of the Congo male singers
Democratic Republic of the Congo songwriters
Year of birth missing (living people)
21st-century Democratic Republic of the Congo people